Reykandeh (also Romanized as Rīkandeh) is a village in Kuhsaran Rural District, in the Central District of Qaem Shahr County, Mazandaran Province, Iran. At the 2006 census, its population was 846, in 268 families.

References 

Populated places in Qaem Shahr County